Niall Sheehy was a Gaelic footballer from Tralee, County Kerry. He played Gaelic football and hurling with his local club John Mitchels, he also played hurling with Austin Stacks. He was also a member of the senior Kerry county football team from the 1958 until 1965, where he was nicknamed "Eusébio" for his kicking ability. He also played for the Kerry county hurling team. His father was John Joe Sheehy. His brothers - Seán Óg and Paudie - both won All-Ireland titles with Kerry in the 1960s.  Sheehy captained Kerry to the All-Ireland final in 1964, but lost out to Galway. He also won an All-Ireland Junior Hurling Championship medal in 1961, Kerry's first All Ireland Hurling title since 1891, as well as 3 National Hurling League Div 2 titles.

At club level Sheehy was part of the famed John Mitchels team of the 1950s and 1960s, winning seven Kerry Senior Football Championships (1952, five in a row from 1959 to 1963 and again in 1966).

Honours

Club
John Mitchels
Kerry Senior Football Championship (7): 1952, 1959 (c), 1960, 1961, 1962, 1963, 1966

County
Kerry
Football
Munster Senior Football Championship (6): 1958, 1960, 1961 (c), 1962, 1963 (c), 1964 (c)
All-Ireland Senior Football Championship (2): 1959, 1962
National Football League (2) 1961, 1963

Hurling
Munster Junior Hurling Championship (1): 1961
All-Ireland Junior Hurling Championship (1): 1961
National Hurling League Division 2 (3) 1957. 1963, 1968

References

Year of birth missing (living people)
Living people
Dual players
John Mitchels (Kerry) Gaelic footballers
John Mitchels (Kerry) hurlers
Austin Stacks hurlers
Kerry inter-county Gaelic footballers
Kerry inter-county hurlers
Munster inter-provincial Gaelic footballers
Niall